Pol-e Dokhtar County is in Lorestan province, Iran. The capital of the county is the city of Pol-e Dokhtar. At the 2006 census, the county's population was 74,537 in 16,278 households. The following census in 2011 counted 75,327 people in 19,276 households. At the 2016 census, the county's population was 73,744 in 21,303 households.

Administrative divisions

The population history of Pol-e Dokhtar County's administrative divisions over three consecutive censuses is shown in the following table. The latest census shows two districts, seven rural districts, and two cities.

References

 

Counties of Lorestan Province